Babakir Baderkhan Shawkat Zebari is a Kurdish former KDP politician and retired General in the Iraqi Army. Zebari was chief of staff of the Iraqi army from 2004 till 2015.

Education
General Babakir's military education includes Light Air Defense Artillery Course, Iraqi Commando School, Thunderbolt School (Ranger), Airborne School, and Battlefielding (Special Forces).  He is trained on several Anti-Tank weapon systems to include COBRA, SSII, and SAKER.

Career
General Babakir began his military career in 1970 after graduating from the Rustamiyah Military Academy in Baghdad at a time when Kurdish citizens were scarcely allowed to serve at all.  Upon completion of the Light Air Defense Artillery Course, General Babakir went to Jordan where he served as a platoon commander in an Iraqi Light Air Defense Artillery Battalion.

From 1971 until 1973 General Babakir served in a variety of leadership and technical positions in Baghdad, Taji, and Habiniyah, Iraq.  By 1973 General Babakir determined that he could no longer remain in the Iraqi Army due to the unjust policies of the Iraqi government under the Arab Socialist Ba'ath Party.  He left the Iraqi Army and joined the Kurdish Revolution under the leadership of Mulla Mustafa Barzani.

General Babakir served as a combat company commander with the 1st Brigade of the Kurdish Revolution Army in Galala. He later transferred to the Bahdinan Region (Dahuk) where he served as Deputy Commander of the only artillery battalion in the 1st Army of Peshmerga.  Later, he was assigned as a Deputy Commander of the Ammadiyah Brigade.

After the Treaty of Algiers and Iraqi Kurdistan's loss in the Second Iraqi–Kurdish War, General Babakir and his family asked for political asylum in Iran and moved to Karaj near Tehran. In 1979, General Babakir returned to Iraq and joined the Kurdish revolution as the Military Commander of the Kurdish Army Headquarters and a member of the Kurdistan Democratic Party (KDP) Military office.  In 1989, he became a member of the Central Committee of the KDP in charge of the Liaison Office with the Government of Iraq. Between 1980 and 1991, General Babakir commanded the Shekhan and Aqra districts in Kurdistan.

In 1991, General Babakir was the commander of all Kurdish forces in Dahuk and Mosul districts and participated in the Revolution against the government in Iraq following the 1st Gulf War. In this position he was responsible for military liaison between the Kurdistan region, Turkey, and Iraq.

During Operation Iraqi Freedom, General Babakir played a major role in the assistance of Coalition Forces operating within the Kurdistan region.  In 2004, General Babakir was selected to serve as the Commanding General and Chief of Staff, Iraqi Joint Forces. He is fluent in Kurdish, Arabic, and Persian.

In 2015, General Babakir was removed from his post following the military's poor performance in the Iraqi Civil War.

Decorations and Badges
Barzani Award (the highest Kurdish Award)
Legion of Merit (United States)

References

Living people
Iraqi insurgency (2003–2011)
Iraqi Kurdish people
Iraqi generals
People from Erbil
Recipients of the Legion of Merit
Year of birth missing (living people)